Friedrich Heinrich Wilhelm Martini (31 August 1729,Ohrdruf – 27 June 1778, Berlin) was a German physician, translator and conchologist.

Martini who practised medicine in Hamburg began, in 1769, the richly colour illustrated shell book: Neues systematisches Conchylien-Cabinet published by Gabriel Nikolaus Raspe at Nürnberg. But he died after the publication of the third volume. His work was continued by Johann Hieronymus Chemnitz (1730–1800) who added eight volumes between 1779 and 1795. Even though the work does not use the binomial system both are considered the authors of the new species figured. He was a Member of Berlinische Gesellschaft Naturforschender Freunde.

References

External links
BHL Digital Neues systematisches Conchylien-Cabinet
BHL Typescript index to Neues systematisches Conchylien-Cabinet
Zoologica Göttingen State and University Library Digital Neues systematisches Conchylien-Cabinet

Conchologists
18th-century German physicians
1729 births
1778 deaths